

The Diocese of Mannar is a Roman Catholic diocese for north-western Sri Lanka, administered by the Bishop of Mannar, currently Fidelis Fernando.

History 
The Diocese of Mannar was created on 24 January 1981 from parts of the Diocese of Jaffna. Between 14 January 2016 and 22 November 2017, the position of Bishop remained vacant, the diocese being overseen by Apostolic Administrator and retired Bishop Kingsley Swampillai.

See also 
 Mannar Catholic martyrs (1544)

Bishops

Notable Churches 

 Shrine of Our Lady of Madhu
 St. Sebastian's Cathedral, Mannar
 St.Antony’s Church, Nedunkandal
Our lady of Refuge Church, Ithikandal
Our lady of Velankani Church, Thamari Kulam, Adampan
St.Philip Neto’s Church, Kannady
The Sacred Heart Church, Adampan
Our lady of Sorrows Church, Adampan
Karthar Kovil, Adampan
St. Joseph Church, Andankulam
St.Michel’s Church, Tharavankoddai
St.Joseph Vazz Church, Kallikulam
St. Francis Xavier Shrine, Velankulam
St.Lawrence Church, Thalimanar
Holy Rosary Church, Thalaimannar
Christ the King Church, Santhapuram
St.Anne’s Church, Sinnakadai

References 

 
Organisations based in Northern Province, Sri Lanka
Mannar
Mannar